Vytautas Kulakauskas (August 25, 1920, in Kuršėnai – December 22, 2000, in Vilnius) was a Lithuanian basketball player, coach, and educator, who competed for the Soviet Union in the EuroBasket 1947 and won a gold medal.

Biography
In 1940, Kulakauskas graduated Kaunas Military School. In 1944–1945 he studied at Vytautas Magnus University's Faculty of Medicine. In 1948 he graduated Lithuanian Sports University.

In 1945–1950 he taught at Lithuanian Sports University. In 1950–1960 at Lithuanian University of Educational Sciences, he was Head of the Department of Physical Education, in 1957–1960 even was the Dean of the Faculty of Music. In 1961–1980 became Vilnius Gediminas Technical University teacher, from 1964 Head of the Department of Physical Education. In 1968 he became associate professor.

He also published the book Krepšininko treniruote (English: The basketball player workout), where he included many epitomes regarding the training.

Personal life
He had a wife, Elena Kulakauskienė.

Soviet Union national team
In a 1990s interview, Kulakauskas described the Soviet squad by telling: "It could be said that there were the physical preparations and shootings, however all the tactics and the game-play was given to them by us. I remember by preparing for the Olympics in February, in Moscow, we were working on tactics for a month. On tactics exercises without any game-play. Not a single minute. We were working the whole month on techniques and tactics improvement. We gave the whole American school to them, which we received from the Lithuanian Americans".

References

1920 births
2000 deaths
Lithuanian men's basketball players
Lithuanian basketball coaches
Soviet men's basketball players
Soviet basketball coaches
BC Žalgiris players
FIBA EuroBasket-winning players
People from Kuršėnai
Honoured Masters of Sport of the USSR
Vytautas Magnus University alumni
Lithuanian Sports University alumni
Academic staff of Lithuanian Sports University
Academic staff of the Lithuanian University of Educational Sciences